Losing Sleep is the debut album by Axle Whitehead, released on 23 August 2008. Whitehead began working on material for his debut album shortly after he resigned as host of Video Hits with several songwriters and producers in the twelve months preceding the album's release. The album's first single, "I Don't Do Surprises", became Whitehead's first top ten single, peaking at number eight on the Australian ARIA Singles Chart, and also reached number two on the Australasian singles chart, and was certified Gold by ARIA. The album's second single was "Anywhere". The album's third single was "Satellite".

Track listing

Personnel
Axle Whitehead – vocals
Robert Conley – piano, keyboards and programming
Carl Dimitaga – guitar and bass guitar except "Landslide" and additional guitars on "Anywhere"
James Bryan – guitars on "Anywhere"
Reece Turbin – guitars on "I Don't Do Surprises"
Terepai Richmond – live drums on "Satellite", "You", "Over to You Now", "Face the Music", "Waiting for Something to Happen" and "Mabe I Was Wrong"
Axle Whitehead – live drums on "I Don't Do Surprises" and "Free Man"
George Muranyi – live piano on "You"
Barbara Griffin – co-producer and engineer on "Way Home", live piano on "You"
Joe Hamill – guitars on "Way Home"
Michael "Fingaz" Mugisha – writer, arranger on "You"
Karin Catt – photography
Julian Peploe – art direction
Jane Wallace – packaging design

Charts

Release history

References

Axle Whitehead albums
2008 albums
Sony BMG albums